The Brazilian Academy of Sciences ( or ABC) is the national academy of Brazil. It is headquartered in the city of Rio de Janeiro and was founded on May 3, 1916.

Publications

It publishes a large number of scientific publications, among them the Anais da Academia Brasileira de Ciências  (2020 IF 1.280).

People

Presidents
 1916–1926 Henrique Charles Morize
 1926–1929 Juliano Moreira
 1929–1931 Miguel Osório de Almeida
 1931–1933 Eusébio Paulo de Oliveira
 1933–1935 Arthur Alexandre Moses
 1935–1937 Álvaro Alberto da Mota e Silva
 1937–1939 Adalberto Menezes de Oliveira
 1939–1941 Inácio Manuel Azevedo do Amaral
 1941–1943 Arthur Alexandre Moses
 1943–1945 Cândido Firmino de Melo Leitão
 1945–1947 Mario Paulo de Brito
 1947–1949 Arthur Alexandre Moses
 1949–1951 Álvaro Alberto da Mota e Silva
 1951–1965 Arthur Alexandre Moses
 1965–1967 Carlos Chagas Filho
 1967–1981 Aristides Pacheco Leão
 1981–1991 Maurício Peixoto
 1991–1993 Oscar Sala
 1993–2007 Eduardo Krieger
 2007–2016 Jacob Palis Jr.
 2016– Luiz Davidovich

Notable members

ABC has a distinguished array of national and international members, among them:

Alain Meunier
Alfred Maddock
Alvaro Penteado Crosta
Amir Ordacgi Caldeira
Aziz Nacib Ab'Saber 
Carl Djerassi
Carlos Henrique de Brito Cruz
Charles D. Michener
Chen Ning Yang
Chintamani Nagesa Ramachandra Rao
Claude Cohen-Tannoudji
Constantino Tsallis
Crodowaldo Pavan
D. Allan Bromley
David Goldstein
David Henry Peter Maybury-Lewis
Edmundo de Souza e Silva
Eduardo Moacyr Krieger
Eduardo Oswaldo Cruz
Ernst Wolfgang Hamburger
Harold Max Rosenberg
Henry Taube
Jayme Tiomno
Jean-Christophe Yoccoz
Jens Martin Knudsen
João Lucas Marques Barbosa
John Campbell Brown
José Goldemberg
José Leite Lopes
Liu Hsu
Luiz Pinguelli Rosa
Marcia C. Barbosa
Marco Antonio Zago
Marcos Moshinsky
Maurício Rocha e Silva
Mayana Zatz
Mildred S. Dresselhaus
Nicole Marthe Le Douarin
Nivio Ziviani
Norman Ernest Borlaug
Nuno Alvares Pereira
Oscar Sala
Oswaldo Frota-Pessoa
Peter H. Raven
Pierre Gilles de Gennes
Ricardo Renzo Brentani
Richard Darwin Keynes
Richard Williams
Sérgio Henrique Ferreira
Simon Schwartzman
Stanley Kirschner

Walter S. Leal
Warwick Estevam Kerr
William Sefton Fyfe

References

External links

List of publications

1916 establishments in Brazil
Brazil
Scientific organisations based in Brazil
Scientific organizations established in 1916
Members of the International Council for Science
Organisations based in Rio de Janeiro (city)
Members of the International Science Council